Benoit Huot  (born January 24, 1984) is a Canadian Paralympic swimmer, who has won nine Paralympic Games gold medals for Canada, primarily in the freestyle and butterfly strokes.

Hailing from Longueuil, Quebec, Huot was born with club feet, started swimming competitively at age 10 at the CAMO Natation club, where he is trained by Benoit Lebrun. In the beginning he competed alongside able-bodied swimmers and competed at two Quebec Games, earning silver in 1997.

Career
Benoit Huot made his international debut in 1998 as a member of Canada's team at the International Paralympic Committee world championships, where he won two gold and four silver medals. He added three more gold and three silver medals at the 2000 Paralympics and eight medals at the 2002 IPC Swimming World Championships.

In 2003, Huot was named the male athlete of the year with a disability by the International Commonwealth Federation.

In 2004, Huot grabbed five gold medals, one silver medal and three world records at the 2004 Paralympic Games in Athens.

In 2005, Huot won six golds at the Disability Sport England Swimming Championships. He then went on to take a gold and a silver at the inaugural Paralympic World Cup in Manchester in events that were swum just 15 minutes apart. This led the Swimming World Magazine to award him the World Disabled Swimmer of the Year award.

At the 2012 Summer Paralympics in London he won gold, silver, and bronze medals, giving him a total of 19 medals in four Paralympic Games. He was named Canada's flag bearer for the Games closing ceremony.

Huot has served on the athletes' council with Swimming Canada, the Canadian Paralympic Committee and Commonwealth Games Federation.

Awards and honours
In 2011, Huot was inducted into the Canadian Disability Hall of Fame. In December 2016, Huot was named a Member of the Order of Canada. In 2018, he was made a Knight of the National Order of Quebec.

Robbery
On July 27, 2014, Huot's home in Longueuil was robbed. Among the stolen items were seven medals, including two Paralympic medals. The athlete then appealed to the public Sunday afternoon on Twitter. The idea of never seeing his medals is "heartbreaking," he pleads. "Those medals represent a lifetime of work.  Hours and hours of work to get them," said Huot in an interview.

As Huot's house was under renovation at the time, he was not there when it was broken into during the night from Saturday to Sunday. The Longueuil Police Department is continuing its investigation.

References

External links
 
 
 
 
 
 

1984 births
Living people
Canadian male freestyle swimmers
Canadian male butterfly swimmers
Paralympic swimmers of Canada
Swimmers at the 2000 Summer Paralympics
Swimmers at the 2004 Summer Paralympics
Swimmers at the 2008 Summer Paralympics
Swimmers at the 2012 Summer Paralympics
Swimmers at the 2016 Summer Paralympics
Paralympic gold medalists for Canada
Paralympic silver medalists for Canada
Commonwealth Games silver medallists for Canada
Sportspeople from Longueuil
World record holders in paralympic swimming
Commonwealth Games gold medallists for Canada
Medalists at the 2000 Summer Paralympics
Medalists at the 2004 Summer Paralympics
Medalists at the 2008 Summer Paralympics
Medalists at the 2012 Summer Paralympics
Medalists at the 2016 Summer Paralympics
Sportspeople with club feet
S10-classified Paralympic swimmers
Members of the Order of Canada
Paralympic bronze medalists for Canada
Commonwealth Games medallists in swimming
Canadian Disability Hall of Fame
Knights of the National Order of Quebec
Swimmers at the 2006 Commonwealth Games
Medalists at the World Para Swimming Championships
Paralympic medalists in swimming
Medalists at the 2015 Parapan American Games
Medallists at the 2006 Commonwealth Games